Saudi Arabia participated in the 2010 Summer Youth Olympics in Singapore.

The country does not allow women to participate in the Olympics, and had never sent a female athlete to the Olympic Games. Nonetheless, it did send one female competitor to these inaugural Youth Games: Dalma Rushdi Malhas, who competed in equestrian and won Saudi Arabia's only medal, a bronze. The International Olympic Committee had made it a requirement for every national delegation to include at least one female athlete.

Medalists

Athletics

Boys
Track and Road Events

Field Events

Equestrian

Swimming

Weightlifting

References

External links
Competitors List: Saudi Arabia

2010 in Saudi Arabian sport
Nations at the 2010 Summer Youth Olympics
Saudi Arabia at the Youth Olympics